Osvaldo Farrés (born 21 August 1967) is a Paraguayan sports shooter. He competed in the mixed trap event at the 1984 Summer Olympics.

References

1967 births
Living people
Paraguayan male sport shooters
Olympic shooters of Paraguay
Shooters at the 1984 Summer Olympics
Place of birth missing (living people)
20th-century Paraguayan people